Abraham Brookins Gardner (September 2, 1819 – November 23, 1881) was a Vermont attorney and businessman who served as 25th lieutenant governor of Vermont from 1865 to 1867.

Early life and business career
Abraham Brookins Gardner was born in Pownal, Vermont, on September 2, 1819. He was the son of David and Eunice (Wright) Gardner. He graduated Phi Beta Kappa from Union College in 1842, where he was a member of the Delta Upsilon fraternity.  Gardner then studied law and became an attorney and business owner in Bennington, Vermont, including serving as President of the Eagle Square Manufacturing Company and the Bennington and Rutland Railroad.

Political career
A Republican, he was Register of Probate for the Bennington District from 1848 to 1857, State's Attorney from 1855 to 1857, and Vermont's Banking Commissioner from 1859 to 1860.

From 1860 to 1865 Gardner served in the Vermont House of Representatives, and he was Speaker from 1863 to 1865.

He was Lieutenant Governor from 1865 to 1867, and also served as a member of the Republican National Committee.

Later life
Gardner served in the Vermont Senate from 1870 to 1872, and in 1872 was an unsuccessful candidate for Governor as the fusion candidate of Democrats and Liberal Republican backers of Horace Greeley for President. Later in the 1870s he served as a member of the Bennington Battle Monument Commission.

Death and burial
Gardner died in Bennington on November 23, 1881. He was buried in Old Bennington Cemetery.

Other
His first name sometimes appears in records as Abram and his middle name is sometimes written as "Brooks" or "Brookings". Several of Gardner's relatives shared the Abraham B. Gardner name, including one who lived from January 6, 1858, to January 2, 1914, and was a member of the Vermont House of Representatives.

References

1819 births
1881 deaths
Vermont lawyers
State's attorneys in Vermont
Republican Party members of the Vermont House of Representatives
Speakers of the Vermont House of Representatives
Lieutenant Governors of Vermont
Republican Party Vermont state senators
People from Bennington, Vermont
Vermont state court judges
Burials in Vermont
19th-century American politicians
19th-century American judges
19th-century American lawyers